Benjamin Albert Beney (21 February 1887 – 20 April 1915) was an English professional footballer who played in the Football League for Woolwich Arsenal and Bury as a forward. He scored prolifically for Hastings & St Leonards United in non-League football, with 142 goals in 86 appearances.

Personal life 
Beney worked as a plumber's mate. He served as a corporal in the Royal Engineers during the First World War and died of wounds in West Flanders on 20 April 1915. Beney was buried in Poperinghe Old Military Cemetery.

Career statistics

References

1915 deaths
Sportspeople from Hastings
English footballers
English Football League players
Association football forwards
Hastings & St Leonards United F.C. players
British Army personnel of World War I
Royal Engineers soldiers
British military personnel killed in World War I
Arsenal F.C. players
Carlisle United F.C. players
Bury F.C. players
Tunbridge Wells F.C. players
Southern Football League players
1887 births